Joseph W. Nixon High School is a public high school located in South Texas. It was built in 1964 as the second high school in Laredo, Texas. The original high school in Laredo is Raymond & Tirza Martin High School, previously known as Laredo High School. Both are part of the Laredo Independent School District (LISD).

Over a period of two years (2014-2015), J. W. Nixon underwent a forty million renovation. Several older campus buildings were demolished to create a reconfigured two-story building centered about a U-shaped courtyard. Funds for the project were mostly derived from a construction bond package approved by voters. , J. W. Nixon has a new Tennis Complex and Track & Field Complex, along with new classrooms.

History

J. W. Nixon is named for a former LISD superintendent. It opened its doors in September 1964, with W. E. Lockey serving as Nixon's first principal. The first class to graduate was the Class of 1965. Initially, J.W. Nixon served as a junior high/high school with grades seven through twelve. In 2007 J.W. Nixon had a record breaking with more than 400 students graduating.

About 2 a.m. on December 7, 2012, arsonists torched three portable buildings at Nixon High School. Three other classrooms sustained smoke damage. No individuals were physically harmed in the fire.

In 2014, Nixon fell short on minimum state standards and were placed on the Public Education Grant list.

Viola Ileana Martinez Moore (1929-2017), born in Zapata and a graduate of Martin High School in Laredo, was a subsequent principal of J. W. Nixon, the first Hispanic woman to head a 5-A high school in Texas. The J. W. Nixon Band Hall is named in her honor. After regular retirement, she served for two terms as a trustee of the Laredo Independent School District and as principal of the Roman Catholic Blessed Sacrament Elementary School in Laredo. Her obituary describes her as one of "no limitations, a goal-getter, a catcher of dreams, and the best example for our community as a whole."

Among the original J. W. Nixon faculty is Cecilia Cantu. Another member, Laura Garcia Magnon (died 2012), retired after forty-five years of continuous service to J. W. Nixon. The Nixon science building is named in her honor.

In 2015, Pedro "Pete" Solis of Nixon High School was named "Texas Coach of the Year" for Class 5A by the Texas Association of Basketball Coaches.

Notable alumni
Freddie Benavides - Professional baseball player
Louis H. Bruni - Businessman, former Webb County judge and former member of the Laredo City Council
Dr. Francisco G. Cigarroa - former President of University of Texas at San Antonio Science Center and current Chancellor of the University of Texas System
Henry Cuellar - United States Representative (28th District)
Elma Salinas Ender - retired 341st District Court judge; first Hispanic woman to serve on a district court in Texas

References

External links

 

High schools in Laredo, Texas
Laredo Independent School District high schools